Louise Margaret Duncan (born February 2000) is a Scottish professional golfer. She won The Women's Amateur Championship in 2021 and finished tied for 10th at the 2021 Women's British Open.

Amateur career
Duncan started playing golf at 10. She is a product of West Kilbride Golf Club on Scotland's west coast, where she has been coached by club professional Iain Darroch. An R&A Scholar and University of Stirling student, Duncan has benefited from coaching by former European Tour winner Dean Robertson, who also served as her caddie during the 2021 Women's British Open.

In 2018, she won the Fairhaven Trophy and was runner-up at the Scottish Girls' Amateur Championship. In 2019, she was 3rd at the Scottish Women's Amateur Championship held at Kilmarnock (Barassie) Golf Club. In 2021, she triumphed at the Womens Amateur Championship, the first Scot to win the Women's Amateur since Alison Rose in 1997. Her win was also notable as she recorded the largest winning margin in the championship's history, beating Jóhanna Lea Lúđvíksdóttir, 9 and 8.

Duncan has represented Scotland at the Girls Home Internationals, Women's Home Internationals, European Girls' Team Championship and the European Ladies' Team Championship. She was part of Great Britain and Ireland's 2021 Curtis Cup team at Conwy Golf Club and in 2022 at Merion. 

Duncan's Women's Amateur win qualified her for the 2021 Women's British Open at Carnoustie Golf Links, where she was the breakout star of the week. After rounds of 68, 73 and 68 she was tied for fourth place, only two strokes behind joint leaders Nanna Koerstz Madsen and Anna Nordqvist. She had a final round 72, to finish in a tie for 10th place. She joined winner Anna Nordqvist at the trophy presentation to accept the Smyth Salver for low amateur.

Professional career
Duncan turned professional in July 2022.

Amateur wins
2018 Fairhaven Trophy
2020 R&A Student Tour Series - Portugal
2021 The Womens Amateur Championship

Source:

Results in LPGA majors

LA = Low amateur
"T" = tied

Team appearances
Amateur
Girls Home Internationals (representing Scotland): 2017, 2018
European Girls' Team Championship (representing Scotland): 2017, 2018
World Junior Girls Championship (representing Scotland): 2018
Women's Home Internationals (representing Scotland): 2019, 2021
European Ladies' Team Championship (representing Scotland): 2021, 2022
Curtis Cup (representing Great Britain & Ireland): 2021, 2022
Source:

References

External links

Scottish female golfers
Winners of ladies' major amateur golf championships
Sportspeople from North Ayrshire
2000 births
Living people